Kansan Lehti (Finnish: People’s Newspaper) was a social democratic newspaper published in Tampere from 1898 until 1991. The first issue of the paper appeared in December 1898. In the early period it was a handwritten publication and had a socialist political stance. During this period it came out six times per week and sold nearly 10,000 copies. Over time the paper became affiliated with the Social Democratic Party. One of its financial managers was Vihtori Kosonen who began to serve in the post in 1906.

References

Finnish Civil War
Publications established in 1898
Publications disestablished in 1991
Finnish-language newspapers
Socialist newspapers
Defunct newspapers published in Finland